The eastern miombo sunbird or miombo double-collared sunbird (Cinnyris manoensis) is a species of bird in the family Nectariniidae. It is found in central and eastern Africa.

References

External links
 Miombo double-collared sunbird - Species text in The Atlas of Southern African Birds.

Eastern Miombo sunbird
Birds of Southern Africa
Birds described in 1907
Taxonomy articles created by Polbot